Georg Neuber (11 December 1925 – 6 April 2022) was a German fencer. He represented the United Team of Germany at the 1960 Summer Olympics in the individual and team épée events.

Neuber died on 6 April 2022, at the age of 96.

References

1925 births
2022 deaths
Fencers at the 1960 Summer Olympics
German male fencers
Olympic fencers of the United Team of Germany
Sportspeople from Königsberg